Valdo Randpere (born 4 February 1958) is an Estonian politician, musician and businessman.

Randpere was born in Tallinn and graduated from the University of Tartu with a law degree (cum laude) in 1982.

In 1984, he escaped from Soviet Estonia together with his then wife Leila Miller and moved to Sweden.

Since 1998 Valdo Randpere was serving as Country general manager for IBM Estonia.

In 2008, Valdo Randpere won the Estonian version of the Just the Two of Us (Laulud Tähtedega) reality television singing contest in duet with Estonian singer Eda-Ines Etti.

External links
 Valdo Randpere and Leila Miller escape from Soviet occupied Estonia to the west
 Out of Reach Not being anxious to travel to Afghanistan

1958 births
Living people
Estonian businesspeople
20th-century Estonian male singers
Estonian pop singers
Estonian Reform Party politicians
Politicians from Tallinn
21st-century Estonian politicians
University of Tartu alumni
Members of the Riigikogu, 2011–2015
Members of the Riigikogu, 2019–2023
Members of the Riigikogu, 2015–2019
21st-century Estonian male singers